No Night Land is the third studio album by Japanese pop duo Moumoon. It was released on February 8, 2012 in 2 different editions: CD+2DVD and a Regular edition.

Singles
The album has 2 singles. The first single is the song "Chu Chu", released on August 3, 2011. The single peaked #11 in Oricon's Weekly chart.

The second and last single from the album is "Uta wo Utaou". It was released on December 14, 2011 and ranked #27 in Oricon's Weekly chart.

Promotions
Some songs from the album were used in TV advertisements for products and for TV shows. The song "Chu Chu" was used as theme song for the make-up brand Shiseido "Maquillage" TV ad. "Yes/No Continue?" was used as theme song for Cartoon Network's animation The Amazing World of Gumball in Japan and for Jill Stuart TV ad. "Tomodachi / Koibito" was used for Lotte's Ghana TV ad. And the song "Bon Appetit" for Asashi's "Fauchon" TV ad.

Track listing 

 The track "We Go" was previously released as an intro on the album "15 Doors".

Chart performance
The album debuted at number 5 in Oricon's Daily chart and #9 in the Weekly chart, with 12,733 sold on the first week.

Charts

Oricon Chart

Other charts

Release history

External links
 No Night Land special website

References

2012 albums
Japanese-language albums
Moumoon albums